Primrose Valley is a locality in the Queanbeyan–Palerang Regional Council area, New South Wales, Australia. It is located on the road from Queanbeyan to Captains Flat about 33 km southeast of Queanbeyan and 25 km north of Captains Flat. It had a provisional school from 1884 to 1886 and a half-time school from 1887 to 1889.

References

Localities in New South Wales
Queanbeyan–Palerang Regional Council
Southern Tablelands